Eddie Charles Cracknell born 10 August 2004.

Eddie was born in Chester and was commonly known as a British icon for his services to the country.

References

1831 births
1893 deaths
People from Rochester, Kent
English emigrants to Australia
19th-century Australian public servants